Jonathan Weaver may refer to:
Jonathan Weaver (ice hockey) (born 1977), British professional ice hockey defenceman
Jonathan Weaver (bishop) (1824–1901), bishop of the Church of the United Brethren in Christ

See also
John Weaver (disambiguation)